Ani-ye Olya (also Romanized as Ānī-ye ‘Olyā; also known as Ānī, Anī-ye Bālā, Annī-ye Bālā, Ini, and Inj) iis a village in Ani Rural District of the Central District of Germi County, Ardabil province, Iran. At the 2006 census, its population was 1,164 in 195 households. The following census in 2011 counted 992 people in 239 households. The latest census in 2016 showed a population of 813 people in 221 households; it was the largest village in its rural district.

Tageo

References 

Germi County

Towns and villages in Germi County

Populated places in Ardabil Province

Populated places in Germi County